Nausori is a town in Fiji. It had a population of 57,866 at the 2017 census. This makes it the fourth most populous municipality in the country. Situated 19 kilometers outside of Suva, it forms one pole of the burgeoning Suva-Nausori corridor. Nausori is home to three provinces Rewa, Tailevu and Naitasiri.

The  Rewa Bridge across the Rewa River, built by Fletcher Construction and opened in 2006, links Nausori to the capital, Suva.

Economy

There are two major business areas in Nausori - the town of Nausori proper, and Nakasi. A new market and bus terminal were opened in 2015, allowing for the town's future development. A major upgrade of the local airport, including a new terminal and a longer runway, was expected to get started in the first quarter of 2017.

History

The old town of Nausori was situated around 5 km north of the current one, heading towards Kasavu. The ruins of the old town, situated in Naduruloulou, are still there. Now, it is a tourist centre and a haven for tropical flora and fauna gardens. Colonial buildings, town halls, local courts, and grand residences can be found here, dating back to before the 20th century.

Notable people
Waisea Luveniyali - rugby union player
Latchman Raghubir - village elder and notable leader of the  Kasavu Indian Village 1945 to 1990s
Viliame Kikau - Professional Rugby League Player for the Penrith Panthers who was born in the town of Nausori.
Dr Silo B - studied in Stockholm University and graduated in 1998 with a PhD in GIS and Remote Sensing. Spent her childhood in Nausori.

Sport
Nausori is the home of association football teams Rewa F.C. and Tailevu/Naitasiri F.C. and Rugby Union team Tailevu Knights. Multi-use sports stadium Vodafone Ratu Cakobau Park is in the town and hosts the three teams' matches. The stadium has a capacity of 8,000.

References

External links

 Fiji Government page for Nausori
 Nausori Town Council (official website)

Populated places in Fiji
Tailevu Province